The 1963 Houston Cougars football team was an American football team that represented the University of Houston as an independent during the 1963 NCAA University Division football season. In its second season under head coach Bill Yeoman, the team compiled a 2–8 record. Clem Beard, Demaree Jones, and Frank Brewer were the team captains. The team played its home games at Rice Stadium in Houston.

The game against Louisville was originally scheduled to be played on November 23, but was postponed to December 14 due to the assassination of John F. Kennedy.

Schedule

References

Houston
Houston Cougars football seasons
Houston Cougars football